Beigongmen Station is a station on Line 4 of the Beijing Subway. The station provides close access to the North Gate of the Summer Palace.

Station Layout 
The station has an underground island platform.

Exits 
There are 4 exits, lettered A1, A2, C, and D. Exit C is accessible.

References

External links
 

Summer Palace (Beijing)
Beijing Subway stations in Haidian District
Railway stations in China opened in 2009